The 1994 Bowling Green Falcons football team was an American football team that represented Bowling Green University in the Mid-American Conference (MAC) during the 1994 NCAA Division I-A football season. In their fourth season under head coach Gary Blackney, the Falcons compiled a 9–2 record (7–1 against MAC opponents), finished in second place in the MAC, and outscored their opponents by a combined total of 391 to 174.

The team's statistical leaders included Ryan Henry with 2,368 passing yards, Keylan Cates with 803 rushing yards, and Ronnie Redd with 831 receiving yards.

Schedule

References

Bowling Green
Bowling Green Falcons football seasons
Bowling Green Falcons football